Pudussery East is a village in the Palakkad district, state of Kerala, India. Pudussery Central, Pudussery East and Pudussery West come under administration of the Pudusseri gram panchayat.

Demographics
 India census, Pudussery East had a population of 13,651 with 6,886 males and 6,765 females.

References

External links

Villages in Palakkad district